Truus Kerkmeester (6 December 1921 – 16 June 1990) was a Dutch swimmer. She competed in the women's 100 metre backstroke at the 1936 Summer Olympics.

References

External links
 

1921 births
1990 deaths
Olympic swimmers of the Netherlands
Swimmers at the 1936 Summer Olympics
Sportspeople from Utrecht (city)
Dutch female backstroke swimmers
20th-century Dutch women